Franck Alex Neeb-Noma Blaise Yaméogo, commonly known as Blaise Yaméogo, (born 28 December 1993) is a Burkinabé professional footballer who plays as a forward. Yaméogo started his career in Burkina Faso at Rail Club du Kadiogo, then playing for EF Ouagadougou, before signing a contract in Europe, with Moldovan side Zimbru Chișinău. During the competitive break in the winter of the 2022–2023 season, he signed with CS Gloria Bistrița-Năsăud.

International career
Blaise Yaméogo made his debut for Burkina Faso on 12 August 2017 in a draw against Ghana.

Honours
Rail Club du Kadiogo
 Burkinabé Premier League: 2015–16

Zimbru Chișinău
 Moldovan Cup: Runner-up 2017–18

References

External links
 
 
 

1993 births
Living people
Burkinabé footballers
Burkina Faso international footballers
Association football forwards
Burkinabé Premier League players
Rail Club du Kadiogo players
Étoile Filante de Ouagadougou players
Moldovan Super Liga players
FC Zimbru Chișinău players
Liga I players
AFC Chindia Târgoviște players
Liga II players
CSC 1599 Șelimbăr players
Burkinabé expatriate footballers
Burkinabé expatriate sportspeople in Moldova
Expatriate footballers in Moldova
Burkinabé expatriate sportspeople in Romania
Expatriate footballers in Romania
21st-century Burkinabé people